James McNaughton may refer to:

 James McNaughton (bobsleigh) (born 1987), Canadian Olympic bobsledder
 James McNaughton (Ruairí Óg Cushendall hurler) (c. 1963–2014), Irish hurler
 James McNaughton (Loughgiel Shamrocks hurler) (born 1997), Irish hurler
 James McNaughton (politician), former member of the Legislative Assembly of Alberta from Alberta, Canada

See also
 James MacNaughton, president of the Calumet and Hecla Mining Company